Commercetools, stylized as commercetools, is a cloud-based headless commerce platform that provides APIs to power e-commerce sales and similar functions for large businesses. Both the company and platform are called Commercetools. The company is headquartered in Munich, Germany with additional offices in Berlin, Germany; Jena, Germany; Amsterdam, Netherlands; London, England; Durham, North Carolina; Zürich, Switzerland; Sydney, Australia and Singapore. Through its investor REWE Group it is associated with the omnichannel order fulfillment software solutions provider fulfillmenttools and the payment transactions provider paymenttools. Its clients include Audi, Bang & Olufsen, Carhartt and Nuts.com. Commercetools is a founding member of the MACH Alliance.

History 
Commercetools was founded by Dirk Hoerig and Denis Werner in 2006. It launched its platform in 2013. In 2014, Commercetools was wholly bought by REWE Digital, part of Germany’s REWE Group. Hoerig is credited with coining the term "headless commerce".

In 2018, Commercetools announced a $17 million investment to support its international expansion. It expanded into the U.K market in 2019 with the opening of its London office. In 2020, Commercetools established a presence in Australia, with a team in Melbourne and a data center in Sydney.

In 2019, commercetools raised $145 million from venture capital firm Insight Partners. Insight Partners' managing directors Richard Wells and Matt Gatto joined Commercetools' board of directors as part of the deal. At the same time, Commercetools was spun out by REWE. REWE remains a significant shareholder.

In January 2021, commercetools partnered with car manufacturer Volkswagen Group to use the platform for its group brands, including Volkswagen, Bentley, Porsche and Audi.

In May 2021, REWE group announced additional investment into Commercetools to fund growth into the Chinese market.

In September 2021, commercetools raised $140m in its series C round, led by venture capital firm Accel, valuing the company at $1.9 billion.

In November 2021, commercetools acquired Frontastic for an undisclosed amount.

In 2022, commercetools was named leader in Digital Commerce by the technological research and consulting firm Gartner together with SAP, Adobe Inc., and Salesforce, as well as named leader in the Forrester Wave™ B2B Commerce Solutions, Q2 2022, by Forrester Research a research and advisory company, together with Oracle Corporation and Salesforce.

References 

E-commerce
E-commerce software
German companies established in 2006
Content management systems